Janet Doe (April 11, 1895 in Newbury, Vermont – November 17, 1985 in Somers, New York) was a medical librarian notable for her work at the New York Academy of Medicine and her consultant work with the Army Medical Library. Doe's memory is preserved by the Medical Library Association in its annual lecture series founded in 1965.

References 

1895 births
1985 deaths
American librarians
American women librarians
20th-century American women
20th-century American people